Cascajares de la Sierra is a municipality located in the province of Burgos, Castile and León, Spain. Its history goes back a long time ago. Remains have been found near the place that have occurred in many different time periods. There is a cathedral of paleoanthropology, and was recently named a World Heritage Site.

Monuments

One monument located here is the Church of Cascajares de la Sierra. It has a baptismal font and Romanesque delicate ornamentation. Probably the most remarkable thing here is the semicircular Romanesque apse and the presbytery, which are both considered the pride and joy in the early Romanesque, Visigoth, and even late twelfth century eras.

Gastronomy
The Morcilla de Burgos is a sausage made from pig slaughter. It was made from different parts of the pigs, such as the blood, guts and butter. Plants and spices like paprika were added to improve the flavor. Later, the rice pudding of Burgos was incorporated. Now, the foundation for the Morcilla de Burgos was laid. It is now "soda, tasty and picantosa," with blood, rice, butter, horcal onion, salt, pepper and paprika, all stuffed into casings and then cooked. Eating one is a definite pleasure.

Burgos fresh cheese is "an exquisite and soft unripened cheese with an intense white color, no eyes and usually without bark or very thin crust, a native of Briviesca, a town that has an important livestock of sheep breeding Churra." It is one of the most appreciated and best known European cheeses. At first, it was made from raw sheep milk and animal rennet, seasoned with salt. Then it was put into clay jars and dried in cold, wet places. Nowadays, it is made from "pasteurized sheep's milk, cow or mixture of both." Extra salts and rennet are added after the cheese has been standing for about half an hour at about 84.2 degrees Fahrenheit. Once drained, the cheese can seep into a mold and become saltier. The cheese of Burgos is mostly saturated fatty acids and sometimes cholesterol. It does have a high water content and less fat, so it can be eaten in most diets. The cheese has many minerals and vitamins in it, such as calcium and phosphorus, and vitamins A and E. The whole population can eat this cheese. It is an essential ingredient in many recipes, and cannot be passed by in a "dessert grandfather," served with honey and nuts.

References

External links
Cascajares de la Sierra (In Spanish)
https://web.archive.org/web/20151222180926/http://www.cascajaresdelasierra.es/turismo-y-ocio/monumentos/iglesia-de-cascajares-de-la-sierra
https://web.archive.org/web/20150520061704/http://www.cascajaresdelasierra.es/turismo-y-ocio/gastronomia

Municipalities in the Province of Burgos